GWR County Class may refer to the Great Western Railway County Class steam locomotives:

 GWR 3800 Class "Churchward County" 4-4-0 
 GWR 2221 Class 4-4-2 tank version of the 4-4-0
 GWR 1000 Class "Hawksworth County" 4-6-0